The Manhattan Lady Jaspers basketball team is the basketball team that represents Manhattan College in The Bronx, New York City, New York, United States. The school's team currently competes in the Metro Atlantic Athletic Conference.

Postseason

NCAA Division I appearances
The Lady Jaspers have made four NCAA Division I Tournament appearances. They have a record of 0–4.

WBI appearances
The Lady Jaspers have appeared in the Women's Basketball Invitational (WBI) twice. They have a record of 4–2.

See also
 Manhattan Jaspers and Lady Jaspers
 Manhattan Jaspers basketball
 Sports in the New York metropolitan area

References

External links
 

 

 
Manhattan College
Basketball teams in New York City